A semi-structured interview is a method of research used most often in the social sciences. While a structured interview has a rigorous set of questions which does not allow one to divert, a semi-structured interview is open, allowing new ideas to be brought up during the interview as a result of what the interviewee says. The interviewer in a semi-structured interview generally has a framework of themes to be explored.

Semi-structured interviews are widely used in qualitative research; for example in household research, such as couple interviews. A semi-structured interview involving, for example, two spouses can result in "the production of rich data, including observational data."

Comparison to other types of interviews 
An unstructured interview is the opposite of structured interview, because it tends to be more informal and free flowing and it is more like an everyday conversation.  A structured interview is a type of interview that is completely planned, which means every interviewee gets the same interview questions. A semi-structured interview is the one in between. The questions are loosely structured and give interviewees more opportunities to fully express themselves. However, semi-structured interviews are less objective and legally harder to defend when compared with structured interviews. Semi-structured interviews somewhat restrict the interviewee's free flow of thoughts which limited the potential possibility of the interview as a whole.

Because semi-structured interview is a combination of both structured interviewing and unstructured interviewing, it has both of their advantages. For interviewers, the constructed part of semi-structured interview gives them a general overview of the interviewees. It helps them draw an objective comparison from the interviewees, which is helpful for either qualitative research study or job interview. For interviewees, because the unstructured part of semi-structured interview gives them more space to ask for clarification on answers and to express free flow of thoughts, the interviewees normally feel less stress during the interview. They would present more communication skills to the interviewers and build personal bond with them under the relatively warm and friendly atmosphere.

Advantages and disadvantages

Advantages 
Since a semi-structured interview is a combination of an unstructured interview and a structured interview, it has the advantages of both. The interviewees can express their opinions and ask questions to the interviewers during the interview, which encourages them to give more useful information, such as their opinions toward sensitive issues, to the qualitative research. And they could more easily give the reasons for their answers during the interviews. Plus, the structured part of semi-structured interviews gives the interviewers reliable, comparable qualitative data as well.

Disadvantages 
Even though a semi-structured interview has several advantages, it needs time for the interviewers to prepare and do research before actually starting the interview. And in order to make the results reliable, interviewers need to meet an adequate number of people to conduct the interview. Since it allows people to freely express their thoughts, the interviewers need to carefully plan the questions to make sure they can get the answers they want, which also requires good communication and interviewing skills. Interviewers are responsible for the confidentiality of the interviews.

Interview guides 
The specific topic or topics that the interviewer wants to explore during the interview are typically thought about well in advance—especially during interviews for research projects. It is generally beneficial for interviewers to have an interview guide prepared. An interview guide is an informal grouping of topics and questions that the interviewer can ask in different ways for different participants. Interview guides help researchers to focus an interview on the topics at hand without constraining them to a particular format. This freedom can help interviewers to tailor their questions to the interview context/situation, and to the people, they are interviewing.

There are several things for interviewers to pay attention to while preparing and conducting their interviews. When preparing for the semi-structured interview, the interviewers need to consider the characteristics of their questions. They should use open-ended questions but dichotomous questions which only lead to two opposite answers, and they should avoid asking multiple questions, leading questions or why questions. It is helpful for the interviewers that they have a scale for grading the answers prior to the interview. The drawback of the leading question is that it could subtly orient interviewers toward a certain way. And the downside of why questions is they can make the questions sound judgmental and might generate negative answers. During the interview, interviewers could try to restate and summarize the interviewees' answers to confirm their opinions. They could generate new questions based on interviewers' answers, but the questions should be around the particular qualities and experiences that they are looking for in interviewers. It is also helpful to take detailed notes or recording the whole interview to compare the answers afterward.

Ethical considerations 
Because semi-structured interviews allow people to communicate and express their free flow of thoughts at some degrees, the interviewers need to pay attention to their intercultural competence and cultural dimensions during the communication. Intercultural competence requires people to recognize and respect the diversity of different cultural backgrounds.

People with high intercultural competence often tend to respect individual variations and different cultural patterns. They often have self-assessments and are aware of the differences between people. They make their conclusions and assessments based on reliable evidence. People can improve their intercultural competence by regular self-assessments including their values, beliefs and personal biases to improve their self-awareness. The interviewers need to understand that their personal beliefs and biases may slightly impact the way they address questions and, as a result, influence the outcomes of semi-structured interviews.

Interviewers are also required to realize the cultural dimensions. Lack of the recognition of cultural dimensions could lead to miscommunication and unpleasant results during semi-structured interviews. Having high level of cultural dimensions can be reflected as, for example, respecting masculine, individualistic, uncertainty avoidance cultures.

References

External links
 Semi-structured interview at the Food and Agriculture Organization of the United Nations's website

Qualitative research